Bok a Bok Fried Chicken, or simply Bok a Bok, is a restaurant chain in the U.S. state of Washington. The business specializes in Korean-style fried chicken; the menu has also included chicken sandwiches (including one with yuzu aioli and charred chiles), kimchi mac and cheese, and tots with Chile salt. There are five locations as of 2021. The business started in White Center and later expanded to Burien, the University District, and Capitol Hill. Plans to expand to Kirkland were announced in 2021.

See also 
 Fried chicken restaurant
 List of restaurant chains in the United States

References

External links 

 
 

Burien, Washington
Capitol Hill, Seattle
Kirkland, Washington
Restaurant chains in the United States
Restaurants in Seattle
Restaurants in Washington (state)
University District, Seattle